Culture Shock was a weekly BBC World Service radio programme, hosted by Tim Marlow. The programme ran from 2005–2008.

Format
The programme aimed to examine "the latest cultural trends from around the world, social or technological developments which are reflecting and shaping the way we live: what are people thinking, buying, or doing and why; the next wave of telecommunications, the latest design craze or toy, new ways to entertain, future behaviours".

Guests
Among guests on the programme were:

James Harkin, author of Big Ideas: The Essential Guide to the Latest Thinking
Mark Katz, the author of Capturing Sound: How Technology Has Changed Music
Professor Gerd Gigerenzer
David Levy, author of Love and Sex with Robots

Professor Clay Shirky from New York University
Professor Peter Singer
Jeff Taylor of Monster.com

References

External links
Homepage
Listen again facility

BBC World Service programmes